Essex 1 (known as Essex/Canterbury Jack 1 for sponsorship reasons) is an English rugby union league at the ninth tier of the domestic competition and features teams from Essex and parts of north-east London.  Promoted clubs tend to move up to London 3 Essex. Relegated clubs used to drop into Essex 2 but as that division has been abolished there is currently no relegation. The division was created in 2003 by Essex-based teams who left Eastern Counties 1 and Eastern Counties 2.  Each year some of the clubs in this division also take part in the RFU Junior Vase - a level 9-12 national competition. 

For the 2016–17 season the league was divided into two parallel divisions - Essex 1A and Essex 1B - divided on geographical lines with teams in Essex 1A typically based in the north and east of the county, while teams in Essex 1B are predominantly London based.  Each division plays 14 home and away games from September until February.  From February the top 4 teams from each division go into the Essex 1 Premiership and play for the title and promotion, while the bottom 4 sides from each group would play for the Essex 1 Shied.

For the 2018–19 season Essex 1 would revert to being a single division of 11 teams.

Participating clubs 2022–23
Thirteen teams are competing in Counties 2 Essex in 2022–23. Ten teams took part in Essex 1 in 2021–22; Barking, Basildon, Billericay, Clacton, Harwich & Dovercourt,  Maldon, Millwall, Old Brentwoods, Stanford Le Hope and Writtle Wanderers.

Canvey Island (12th) and Kings Cross Steelers (11th) competed in London 3 Essex in 2021–22. Pegasus Palmerians joined the league as a new team for 2022–23.

Participating clubs 2021–22

The teams competing in 2021-22 achieved their places in the league based on performances in 2019-20, the 'previous season' column in the table below refers to that season not 2020-21.

Ilford Wanderers, who had been relegated from London 3 Essex in 11th place in season 2019-20, withdrew from the league in Autumn 2021 meaning it was completed with eleven teams.

Season 2020–21

On 30th October the RFU announced  that a decision had been taken to cancel Adult Competitive Leagues (National League 1 and below) for the 2020/21 season meaning Essex 1 was not contested.

Participating clubs 2019–20

Participating clubs 2018–19

Participating clubs 2017–18

Essex Canterbury Jack League 1A

Essex Canterbury Jack League 1B

Participating clubs 2016–17

Essex 1A
Bancroft
Billericay
Dagenham
Kings Cross Steelers
Millwall
Old Brentwoods (relegated from London 3 North East)
Pegasus Palmerians
Stanford Le Hope

Essex 1B
Braintree
Burnham-on-Crouch
Canvey Island
Clacton
Harwich & Dovercourt
Maldon
Writtle Wanderers
Witham

Participating clubs 2015–16
Bancroft
Billericay (relegated from London 3 North East)
Braintree 
Canvey Island
Clacton (relegated from London 3 North East)
East London
Ilford Wanderers
Kings Cross Steelers
Maldon
Millwall
Pegasus Palmerians
Stanford Le Hope
Writtle Wanderers

Participating clubs 2014–15
Bancroft
Burnham-on-Crouch
Canvey Island (relegated from London 3 North East)
Dagenham
East London
Epping Upper Clapton
Ilford Wanderers
Maldon
May & Baker
Millwall
Pegasus Palmerians
Writtle Wanderers

Original teams

When Essex 1 was introduced in 2003 it contained the following teams:

Billericay - transferred from Eastern Counties 1 (7th)
Canvey Island - transferred from Eastern Counties 1 (9th)
East London - transferred from Eastern Counties 2 South (runners up)
Epping Upper Clapton - transferred from Eastern Counties 1 (8th)
Ilford Wanderers II - transferred from Eastern Counties 2 South (3rd)
Maldon - transferred from Eastern Counties 1 (3rd)
Stanford Le Hope - transferred from Eastern Counties 1 (10th)
Upminster - relegated from London 4 North East (9th)
Wanstead - transferred from Eastern Counties 1 (4th)
Westcliff - transferred from Eastern Counties 2 South (champions)

Essex 1 honours

Essex 1 (2004–2009)

The original Essex 1 was a tier 9 league with promotion up to London 4 North East and relegation down to Essex 2.

Essex 1 (2009–2017)

Essex 1 remained a tier 9 league despite national restructuring by the RFU.  Promotion was to London 3 North East (formerly London 4 North East) and relegation was to Essex 2 until that division was disbanded at the end of the 2013–14 season.

Essex 1 (2017–present)

The cancellation of London 3 North East and subsequent introduction of London 3 Essex ahead of the 2017–18 meant that Essex 1 remained a tier 9 league with promotion to this new division, and as it was the lowest division for clubs in Essex, there was no relegation.

Promotion play-offs
From 2004 to 2016 there was a play-off between the runners-up of Eastern Counties 1 and Essex 1 for the third and final promotion place to London 3 North East. The team with the superior league record had home advantage in the tie.  At the end of the 2015–16 season the Essex 1 teams had been the most successful with seven wins to the Eastern Counties 1 teams five; and the home team had won promotion on eight occasions compared to the away teams four.  Since the introduction of London 3 Eastern Counties and London 3 Essex at the start of the 2017–18 season the playoff has been cancelled.

Number of league titles

Billericay (2)
Campion (2)
East London (2)
Upminster (2)
Wanstead (2)
Braintree (1)
Dagenham (1)
Kings Cross Steelers (1)
Maldon (1)
May & Baker (1)
Old Brentwoods (1)
Westcliff (1)

See also
London & SE Division RFU
Essex RFU
English rugby union system
Rugby union in England

Notes

References

9
Rugby union in Essex
Sports leagues established in 2003
2003 establishments in England